The 1925 Duke Blue Devils football team was an American football team that represented Duke University as an independent during the 1925 college football season. In its first season under head coach James P. Herron, the team compiled a 4–5 record and was outscored by a total of 142 to 58. Fred Grigg was the team captain.

The university's benefactor, James Buchanan Duke, died on October 10, 1925, the same day as a 41-0 loss to North Carolina.

Schedule

References

Duke
Duke Blue Devils football seasons
Duke Blue Devils football